Feliksas is a Lithuanian male given name, which is derived from the Latin name Felix, meaning "lucky".

Feliksas Daukantas (1915–1995), Lithuanian artist
Feliksas Jakubauskas (born 1949), Lithuanian textile artist
Feliksas Kriaučiūnas (1911–1977), Lithuanian basketball player and coach
Feliksas Vaitkus (1907–1956), American pilot

References

Lithuanian masculine given names